UFC Presents: Aldo vs. Faber, also referred to as WEC 48: Aldo vs. Faber was a mixed martial arts event held by World Extreme Cagefighting that took place on April 24, 2010 at ARCO Arena in Sacramento, California.  This was WEC's first and only event on pay-per-view before their merger with the Ultimate Fighting Championship later that year.

Background
The event was first announced by WEC President Reed Harris on the Dave and Mahoney Show.

Jamie Varner was expected to face Kamal Shalorus at this event, but that bout was called off due to an injury sustained by Shalorus. The match was later rescheduled for WEC 49 on June 20, where both men fought to a split draw.

A bout between Alex Karalexis and Zach Micklewright was due to take place at this event, but Micklewright suffered a broken ankle and was later replaced by Anthony Pettis.

Antonio Banuelos was scheduled to face Damacio Page at the event, but Page was forced off the card with an injury.  Banuelos ending up facing Scott Jorgensen, in a rematch of their bout from WEC 41 which Banuelos won via split decision.

Cub Swanson was scheduled to face WEC newcomer Chan Sung Jung at this event, but Swanson was forced from the card with an injury.  He was replaced by Leonard Garcia.

Mackens Semerzier was scheduled to face Anthony Morrison at this event, but Semerzier was forced from the card with an injury and was replaced by Chad Mendes.

Veteran UFC commentators Mike Goldberg and Joe Rogan handled broadcast duties for the event. Bruce Buffer handled the fighter introductions.

Two of the night's preliminary fights aired on Spike TV, marking the only time that Spike would air live WEC fights before their dissolution.

The advertising & live broadcasts for WEC 48 omitted virtually all references to the WEC brand, with the only exceptions being early versions of the poster, one mention during the broadcast by Joe Rogan, and the WEC logo on the championship belts themselves. During the broadcasts, the announcers referred only to "the organization" while the WEC logo was removed from the cage and the fighters' gloves.

Results

Bonus Awards
Fighters were awarded $175,000 bonuses.
Fight of the Night:  Leonard Garcia vs.  Chan Sung Jung
Knockout of the Night:  Manvel Gamburyan
Submission of the Night:  Benson Henderson

Reported payout 
The following is the reported payout to the fighters as reported to the California State Athletic Commission. It does not include sponsor money or "locker room" bonuses often given by the WEC and also do not include the WEC's traditional "fight night" bonuses.

José Aldo: $40,000 (includes $20,000 win bonus) def. Urijah Faber: $28,000
Benson Henderson: $26,000 ($13,000 win bonus) def. Donald Cerrone: $14,000
Manvel Gamburyan: $36,000 ($18,000 win bonus) def. Mike Brown: $21,000
Shane Roller: $28,000 ($14,000 win bonus) def. Anthony Njokuani: $7,000
Scott Jorgensen: $21,000 ($10,500 win bonus) def. Antonio Banuelos: $7,000
Leonard Garcia: $28,000 ($14,000 win bonus) def. Chan Sung Jung: $5,000
Anthony Pettis: $8,000 ($4,000 win bonus) def. Alex Karalexis: $10,000
Brad Pickett: $8,000 ($4,000 win bonus) def. Demetrious Johnson: $3,000
Chad Mendes: $8,500 ($4,000 win bonus) def. Anthony Morrison: $4,000
Takeya Mizugaki: $16,000 ($8,000 win bonus) def. Rani Yahya: $9,000
Tyler Toner: $5,000 ($2,000 win bonus) def. Brandon Visher: $4,000

See also
 World Extreme Cagefighting
 List of World Extreme Cagefighting champions
 List of WEC events
 2010 in WEC

References

External links
Official WEC website

World Extreme Cagefighting events
2010 in mixed martial arts
Mixed martial arts in Sacramento, California
Sports competitions in Sacramento, California
2010 in sports in California
Events in Sacramento, California